Nangang is a railway and metro station in Taipei, Taiwan served by Taiwan High Speed Rail, Taiwan Railways Administration and Taipei Metro. The station is served by the fastest HSR express services of the 1 series.

History

Nangang Station was originally built by the Japanese during Japanese rule of Taiwan in 1899 to support local industries and the growing population. Since then, the station has been upgraded three times to support tremendous growth: in 1905, in 1966 (due to the KMT moving the ROC government to Taiwan), and in 1986–1987 (to accommodate increased passenger traffic and new cargo traffic).

Expansion
As with most urban train stations in Taipei, Nangang Station was converted from a surface station to an underground station as part of the TRA's Taipei Railway Underground Project, an effort to move existing surface railways from Songshan Station to east of Nangang Station underground to accommodate growing traffic and economic development in Nankang Software Park. Existing TRA platforms were successfully moved underground on 21 September 2008. The 7.6-km tunnel project cost NT$76.5 billion. The high-speed rail extension to the station opened for service in 2016.

The new station is similar to the then-new Banqiao Station in New Taipei, which was reconstructed to accommodate underground platforms and mixed-use development on the existing station site.  The two-level, underground station levels accommodate expanded TRA platforms, new THSR platforms, and new MRT platforms for the Bannan line which was opened on 25 December 2008. It served as the eastern terminal until Taipei Nangang Exhibition Center Bannan Line platform opened in 2011. On 3 January 2010, Exits 3 and 4 for metro station were closed for construction of a passageway with the TRA station. The entire project was completed in February 2011. Platform screen doors were installed on the Nangang line platforms in August 2015.

Public art
The design of the Taipei Metro portion of the station centers around a "Nostalgia and Technology" theme with aqua green selected to signify an image of a fish pond. Paintings by artist Jimmy Liao are displayed around the station including on the platform walls. Many areas have sandblasted glass installed. On the platform, a piece titled "Rapid Transit Platform, the Transport Dock" displays images on benches to evoke memories of former industries in Nangang.

Station layout

Taipei Metro Nangang Station

HSR services
Except Service 203 which departs from Taipei, Services 1334 and 696 which terminate at Taipei, and Services 583 and 598 which are local trains from Taichung - Zuoying, all other train services call at Nangang station. The fastest 1xx series will travel from Nangang to Zuoying in 105 minutes.

Around the station
 Academia Sinica (2.3km to the southeast)
 Nanxing Park (next to the station)
 National Biotechnology Research Park (1.9km to the southeast)
 Nangang Software Park (1km to the northeast)
 Carrefour Nangang Branch (700m to the west)
 Taipei Music Center (900m to the southwest)
 Taipei Municipal Nangang Vocational High School (250m to the north)
 Nangang Senior High School (1.2km to the southwest)
 Yucheng Junior High School (850m to the northeast)
 Nangang Elementary School (700m to the northeast)
 Dongxin Elementary School (850m to the northwest)

See also
 List of railway stations in Taiwan

Notes

References

External links

TRA Nangang Station
Taiwan Railways Administration
THSR Nangang Station
TRTC Route Map & Timetables

Railway stations served by Taiwan Railways Administration
Railway stations in Taipei
Bannan line stations
Railway stations served by Taiwan High Speed Rail
Railway stations opened in 1899
1899 establishments in Taiwan